The Wuhan–Xiantao intercity railway is a railway line in Hubei, China. It opened on 26 December 2020 as part of the Wuhan Metropolitan Area intercity railway.

Services 
The initial service provision was five trains each way per day between Xiantao and Hankou railway station. In June 2022, two additional trains each way were added and the number of destinations was increased.

Future 
There are plans to extend the line to Honghu and Jianli.

References 

Railway lines in China
Railway lines opened in 2020